Tirunelveli Municipal Corporation is the civic body which administers the city of Tirunelveli in Tamil Nadu, India. It consists of a legislative and an executive body. The legislative body is headed by the city mayor while the executive body is headed by a Chief Commissioner.

History 
The former Tirunelveli Municipality was constituted on 1 November 1866 as per the Town Improvements Act of 1865. It initially covered the area of Tirunelveli town and Tirunelveli Junction alone. Palayamkottai used to be an independent municipality. Tirunelveli and Palayamkottai for this reason are even today considered as twin cities. In 1994, Tirunelveli along with Tiruchirappalli and Salem was upgraded to a municipal corporation. Tirunelveli Municipal Corporation was formed by merging the municipalities of Tirunelveli and Palayamkottai along with surrounding areas.

Structure 
Zones of Tirunelveli Municipal Corporation

 Melapalaiyam Zone
 Palayamkottai Zone
 Pettai Zone
 Thatchanallur Zone
 Tirunelveli Town Zone

Achievements 

Tirunelveli Municipal Corporation is the first Municipal Corporation in the whole country to introduce segregation of waste during collection itself. Plastics and polythene bags are collected only on Wednesdays. If citizens are fined for breaking the rule.

References

External links
 Official Website
 Birth Certificate online
 Water bill property Tax
 District election commission

Tirunelveli
Municipal corporations in Tamil Nadu
1866 establishments in British India
1994 establishments in Tamil Nadu